Matoury is a commune of French Guiana, an overseas region and department of France located in South America.

Matoury is a southern suburb of Cayenne, the préfecture and largest city of French Guiana. Cayenne – Félix Eboué Airport, the main international airport of French Guiana, is located in the commune of Matoury.

Air Guyane Express has its head office on the grounds of the airport.

Geography

Location
Matoury is located in French Guiana situated in South America. 
It is bordered by 5 communes: 
 Cayenne in the North
 Rémire-Montjoly in the North-East
 Roura in the East, South-East and South
 Montsinéry-Tonnegrande in the West
 Macouria in the North-West

The city used to be called "Tour de l'Isle" because it is bordered by water :
 Fouillé inlet ( in French "Crique Fouillée") is the limit both with Cayenne and Rémire-Montjoly
 The river Mahury and the southern part of the river Tour de l'Île are the border with Roura
 The Northern part of the river Tour de l'Île and the southern part of the Cayenne river are the boundary with Montsinéry-Tonnegrande
 The Northern part of the Cayenne river is the limit with Macouria

Town planning
The town planning of Matoury is very uneven. Outside the town-centre there are some urbanized areas along the road leading to Cayenne, Macouria and Cayenne – Félix Eboué Airport. PROGT, the professional lyceum in Balata is surrounded by forests. 
The city is urbanizing quickly as a suburb of Cayenne

The main neighbourhoods of Matoury are: 
 Copaya and Barbadine in the town-centre
 Concorde near the Félix Eboué airport
 Larivot next to the Larivot harbour
 Chemin de la Levée
 Stoupan and Degrad on the river Mahury
 Sainte-Rose-de-Lima
 Balata
 Cogneau-Larivot
 La Chaumière

Population

The commune of Matoury experienced a rapid suburbanisation in the late 20th century, and grew from 567 people in 1967 to 31,956 in 2017.

Matoury is a cosmopolitan town. It is home to Amerindians (located in Sainte-Rose-de-Lima, Cécilia and Petit-la-Chaumière), to Afro–French Guianans, Metropolitans, Haïtians, Brazilians, Surinamese, Javanese, Chinese, Maroon and people from British West Indies such as Saint Lucia.

History
In 1838, during the colonial era, the District of Matoury was the third of the French Guiana colony thanks to its large and diversely cultivated areas. The main productions were sugarcane, cotton, clove, achiote and pepper.

Matoury is also home to remains of the past: 
 The Trio fort situated in the Levée location was designed by Vauban and was used to protect the Cayenne Isle, conjointly with the Cépérou and Diamant forts (in Cayenne and Rémire-Montjoly). 
 The Macaye-Duchassis habitation which used to be a cacao and sugar plantation|
 The Lamirande manufacture in Lamirande, next to the PROGT, which used produced sugar and rum between 1927 and 1950.

Administration 

Gabriel Serville was Mayor of the city between 2014 and 2020, and deputy to the French National Assembly since 2012.

Nature 
The Mirande trail is located in Matoury. The trail gives access to the Mont Grand Matoury Nature Reserve on the eponymous mountain.

Notable people
Alex Éric (1990), footballer.

See also
Communes of French Guiana

References

External links
Official site (in French)

Communes of French Guiana